Nota accusativi is a grammatical term meaning "denoting" (lit. "that there" or "who there" in many languages) accusative case.  It is generally applied to the rhetorical participle of the accusative case. An example is the use of the preposition a in Spanish, referring to, as opposed "qualifying" an animate direct object (the "personal a"): "Jorge llama a María" (Jorge calls to Maria).

Esperanto 
Officially, in Esperanto, the suffix letter "n" is used to mark an accusative. But a few modern speakers use the unofficial preposition "na" instead of the final "n".

- Mi havas domon.

- Mi havas na domo.

- I have a house.

Hebrew 
In Hebrew the preposition אֶת et is used for definite nouns in the accusative. Those nouns might be used with the definite article (ה Ha "the"). Otherwise, the object is modified by a possessive pronominal suffix, by virtue of being a nomen regens within a genitive phrasing, or as a proper name.
To continue with the Hebrew example:

Ani ro'eh et ha-kelev. אני רואה את הכלב
I see the dog.

Ani ro'eh et kalbi. אני רואה את כלבי
I see my dog.

Ani ro'eh et kelev Dani'el. אני רואה את כלב דניאל
I see Daniel's dog.

Ani ro'eh et Dani'el. אני רואה את דניאל
I see Daniel.

On the other hand, "I see a dog" is simply "Ani ro'eh kelev." אני רואה כלב 

This example is obviously a specialized use of the nota accusativi, since Hebrew does not use the nota accusativi unless the noun is in the definitive.

Japanese 
In Japanese, the particle "を" (pronounced "お" o) is the direct object marker and marks the recipient of an action.

Toki Pona 
In Toki Pona, the word e is used to mark accusative.

Other languages
Nota accusativi also exists in Armenian, Greek and other languages.

In other languages, especially those with grammatical case, there is usually a separate form (for each declension if declensions exist) of the accusative case.  The nota accusativi should not be confused with such case forms, as the term nota accusativi is a separate particle of the accusative case.

See also 
 Accusative case

References 

Grammatical cases
Parts of speech